Land of the Dead is the sixth album by heavy metal band Jack Starr's Burning Starr. Released on November 11, 2011 by Limb Music. Guest musicians include Ross the Boss and David Shankle. The artwork was made by Ken Kelly

Track listing

Personnel
Todd Michael Hall - Vocals
Jack Starr - Guitar
Ned Meloni - Bass
Kenny "Rhino" Earl  - Drums
Robert (Fuji) Barbour - all rhythm guitars, lead and harmony guitars, production
Marta Gabriel - Keyboards
Ross The Boss - Guest guitar solo on "Warning Fire"
David Shankle - Guest guitar solo on "Never Again"

References 

2011 albums
Albums with cover art by Ken Kelly (artist)